The Chadar Trek or the Zanskar Gorge trek is a winter trail over the frozen Zanskar River, which lies in the Indian union territory of Ladakh. It is traditionally the only means of travel in the area during the harsh winter months. The trail has become popular with foreign adventure tourists.

Trail

The best time to do the Chadar trek is January to February, when the temperature during the winters drops sometimes to -30 to -35 degrees.

Chadar trek starts from Chilling however with time the organisers tend to drive ahead to about 1 km away from the first camp at Tilad Sumdo (10,390 ft). Over the next days the trek moves to higher camps until Nerak (11,150 ft). This is the frozen waterfall and the return point of the trek. There are other variations of the trek which go until Lingshed, while a bigger version goes to Padum over almost 14 days.

Modern road
A road (Nimmu–Padam–Darcha road/ NPD Road, Nimmu is 35 KM from Leh on NH 1) is under construction by Border Roads Organization (BRO), under Ministry of Defense, to maintain year round connectivity between Leh and Zanskar (HQ- Padum) and is expected to complete in couple of years. The locals have been demanding this road, especially to answer medical emergencies during winter. The road construction has disturbed the local wildlife, primarily the snow leopard. It used to be its prime territory for the snow leopards in the winter, but now they dwell up higher in the valley.

Gallery

Video clippings of Chadar trek done in 2014

References

Further reading
 

Geography of Ladakh
Hiking trails in India
Tourism in Ladakh